Lone Tree Cemetery is a , active, nonprofit cemetery, mausoleum and columbarium complex in unincorporated Fairview, California, adjacent to the city of Hayward. The site was first established in 1868. The cemetery has hosted, since 1903, the oldest continuous Memorial Day celebration in southern Alameda County. It contains a memorial to 73 soldiers from Hayward, Castro Valley and San Lorenzo who died in the Vietnam War, and a memorial to Alameda County Sheriff's Deputies and police officers from cities in the county.

Notable burials
 Medal of Honor recipients
 Robert McDonald (1822–1901), for action in the American Indian Wars with the 5th Infantry Regiment
 Others
 Charlie Becker (1887–1968), actor who played the "Mayor of Munchkinland" in The Wizard of Oz
 William Dutton Hayward, namesake of the city of Hayward
 Bob Sweikert (1926–1956), racing driver, 1955 Indianapolis 500 champion
 Pete Knight (1903–1937), 1930s rodeo champion (reinterred in 1960 at Greenwood Cemetery in Hot Springs, Arkansas)

References

External links

 Cemetery website
 

Cemeteries in Alameda County, California
1868 establishments in California
Military monuments and memorials in the United States
Monuments and memorials in California
Law enforcement memorials